

Province of Armagh

Province of Dublin

References

Armorials of the United Kingdom
Church of Ireland
Personal armorials